The International Secretariat of Painters and Allied Trades, also known as the International Secretariat of Painters and Kindred Trades, was a global union federation bringing together trade unions representing painters and decorators.

History
The first international conference of painters' trade unions was held in Leipzig in 1907, and a second was held in Munich in 1911.  This conference agreed to form an international trade federation, which was launched at a further conference, in Zurich, later in the year.

The federation was initially based in Hamburg, and by 1925 it had 11 affiliates, with a total of 181,536 members.  Its headquarters moved to Amsterdam in the early 1930s, and by 1935 it had affiliates in Austria, Czechoslovakia, Denmark, Finland, Germany, Hungary, the Netherlands, Norway, Sweden, Switzerland, the United Kingdom, and the United States, with a total of 237,531 members.

On 1 January 1947, the federation merged into the International Federation of Building and Wood Workers.

Affiliates
As of 1922, the following unions were affiliated:

General Secretaries
1911: Albert Tobler
1914: Otto Streine
1928: Hans Batz
1933: A. J. Dooyes

References

Painters' and decorators' trade unions
Trade unions established in 1911
Trade unions disestablished in 1947
International Federation of Building and Wood Workers